David Russell Russell-Johnston, Baron Russell-Johnston (born David Russell Johnston; 28 July 1932 – 27 July 2008), usually known as Russell Johnston, was a leading Scottish Liberal Democrat politician and was the Leader of the Scottish Liberal Party from 1974 to 1988.

Early life
David Russell Johnston was born on 28 July 1932 at 39 Palmerston Place, Edinburgh to Georgina Margaret Gerrie (née Russell) and David Knox Johnston, a customs and excise officer. He was educated at Portree High School on the Isle of Skye, and attended the University of Edinburgh, graduating in 1957 with an MA in history. After completing national service in the intelligence corps (1958–9) he trained as a teacher at Moray House College of Education, going on to teach at Liberton High School.

In 1961, he won The Observer Mace, speaking with David Harcus and representing the University of Edinburgh.

Political career
He was elected to the House of Commons and represented Inverness for the Liberal Party (1964–83) and Inverness, Nairn and Lochaber as a Member of Parliament (MP) for the Liberal Party (1983–88) and for the Liberal Democrats (1988–97). He also served as leader of the Scottish Liberal Party and as deputy leader of the  Liberal Democrats (1988–92). In October 1966, he proposed a bill of federal law in order to deal with the Scotland and Wales case.

Johnston was knighted in 1985.

In the 1992 election, he made history by holding his seat with just 26% of the vote in a close four-way battle with Labour, the SNP, and the Conservatives. At the time, this was the lowest ever winning percentage for a candidate, until being superseded by Belfast South at the 2015 election. On retiring from the House of Commons in 1997, he was created a life peer as Baron Russell-Johnston of Minginish in Highland, changing his surname by deed poll to allow his forename to be incorporated into his title.

He was a member of the Parliamentary Assembly of the Council of Europe from 1985 to his death in 2008, leading the Alliance of Liberals and Democrats for Europe (ALDE-PACE) from 1994–99, and serving as the Assembly's President from 1999 until 2002. In 2003 Alija Izetbegović described him as "a great friend of Bosnia."

Personal life
In 1967 Johnston married Joan Graham Menzies a bank clerk, and together they had three sons.

Lord Russell-Johnston collapsed and died in a Paris street on 27 July 2008, the day before his 76th birthday. He had been diagnosed with cancer, for which he was receiving chemotherapy. While undergoing treatment he continued to work on human rights issues for the Council of Europe. At the time of his death he and his wife had been estranged for over ten years, although they remained close friends.

References

Obituaries
 Obituary, guardian.co.uk, 29 July 2008; accessed 12 February 2016.

External links
 

1932 births
2008 deaths
People from the Isle of Skye
Knights Bachelor
Leaders of political parties in Scotland
Scottish schoolteachers
Alumni of the University of Edinburgh
Scottish Liberal Party MPs
Scottish Liberal Democrat MPs
Russell-Johnston
Members of the Parliament of the United Kingdom for Highland constituencies
Parliamentary Assembly of the Council of Europe
UK MPs 1964–1966
UK MPs 1966–1970
UK MPs 1970–1974
UK MPs 1974
UK MPs 1974–1979
UK MPs 1979–1983
UK MPs 1983–1987
UK MPs 1987–1992
UK MPs 1992–1997
Deaths from cancer in France
Liberal Party (UK) MEPs
MEPs for the United Kingdom 1973–1979
Recipients of the Order of the Cross of Terra Mariana, 2nd Class
People educated at Portree High School
Politicians awarded knighthoods
Life peers created by Elizabeth II